State Highway 20 is a state highway running across Erode city in the South Indian state of Tamil Nadu. The road is maintained by funds received from the World Bank. It is used as an alternate route to Krishnagiri and Dharmapuri.

Major junctions

 National Highway NH 381A
 State Highway 79 at Erode
 State Highway 15 at Erode
 Erode Ring Road (MDR-62) at BP Agraharam, Erode
 National Highway NH-544 (Old NH-47) at Lakshmi Nagar, Erode

References 

State highways in Tamil Nadu